Macaria abydata, commonly known as the dot-lined angle, is a moth of the  family Geometridae. It is native from northern Argentina to the Caribbean and southern United States (southern states from Arizona to Florida, regularly wandering north to Colorado, Kentucky and other more northern states). It has been introduced to the Pacific and has spread rapidly since. The first introduction occurred  in Hawaii in 1970 (recorded from all the main islands in 1984). Further spread occurred as follows:
1975: Yap, central Micronesia
1976: Bonin Islands (Chichi-jima, Haha-jima)  
1977: Saipan, central Micronesia (1985)  
1980: Okinawa Island 
1983: Taiwan 
1985: Guam, central Micronesia (1985) Sulawesi (1986)  
1986: Tonga (1985), Fiji (1985), Miyako Islands (Miyako-jima), Luzon, the Philippines (1985)  
1987: New Caledonia (1985), Sabah, Malaysia 
1988: western Samoa (1985)  
1992: Hong Kong

The phrase "dot-lined" comes from the evidence of small dots along the postmedial and sometimes median line of both forewing and hindwing(anterior of the marginal band).

Recorded host plants for larvae in its natural range are Vachellia farnesiana, Cassia, Sesbania, Parkinsonia aculeata and Glycine max. Larvae have been observed on Acacia koa and introduced Lysiloma latisiliquum and Litchi chinensis in Hawaii. In the Indo-Australian tropics it has been reared from Leucaena and Mimosa diplotricha.

References

External links

The Moths of Borneo
Moths of Jamaica
Bug Guide

Macariini
Moths of Asia
Moths of North America
Geometridae of South America
Moths of the Caribbean
Moths of Japan
Moths of Central America
Moths described in 1858